The old fashioned glass, otherwise known as the rocks glass and lowball glass (or simply lowball), is a short tumbler used for serving spirits, such as whisky, neat or with ice cubes ("on the rocks"). It is also normally used to serve certain cocktails, such as the old fashioned.   The true old fashioned glass is decorated in the cut glass style, although most modern examples are pressed glass, made using a mold.  The design is essentially English, from the late 18th or 19th-century. Plain glass versions are lowball glasses.

Old fashioned glasses typically have a wide brim and a thick base, so that the non-liquid ingredients of a cocktail can be mashed using a muddler before the main liquid ingredients are added.

Old fashioned glasses usually contain . A double old fashioned glass (sometimes referred to by retailers as a DOF glass) contains .

See also

References

External links
 

Drinking glasses
Drinkware